Senator Crowell may refer to:

Jason Crowell (born 1972), Missouri State Senate
John Crowell (Ohio politician) (1801–1883), Ohio State Senate
Joseph T. Crowell (1817–1891), New Jersey State Senate